Kudrino is a rural locality (a selo) in Ilkinskoye Rural Settlement, Melenkovsky District, Vladimir Oblast, Russia. The population was 94 as of 2010. There are 3 streets.

Geography 
Kudrino is located on the Unzha River, 20 km south of Melenki (the district's administrative centre) by road. Kulaki is the nearest rural locality.

References 

Rural localities in Melenkovsky District